Prey is a 2019 Canadian documentary film, directed by Matt Gallagher. An examination of sexual abuse in the Catholic Church, the film centres on Rod McLeod, a man who is suing the church for restitution after having been abused in childhood by priest William Hodgson “Hod” Marshall, and includes testimonial interviews from some of Marshall's other victims.

The film premiered on April 26, 2019 at the Hot Docs Canadian International Documentary Festival. It won the festival's Rogers Audience Award for Best Canadian Documentary and the Directors Guild of Canada Jury Prize.

The film received two Canadian Screen Award nominations at the 8th Canadian Screen Awards in 2020, for Best Feature Length Documentary and Best Editing in a Documentary.

References

External links 
 

2019 films
Canadian documentary films
Documentary films about pedophilia
Documentary films about Catholicism
2010s English-language films
2010s Canadian films